

Group 7 

All times are local

7